MV Ventura is a  cruise ship of the P&O Cruises fleet. She officially entered service with the company in April 2008 and was named by Dame Helen Mirren. Ventura underwent a refit at the Blohm & Voss shipyard in Hamburg, Germany, during March and April 2013, and re-entered service on 7 April 2013 with a voyage to Spain and Portugal.in February 2023 she underwent a minor re-fit again in the Hamburg ship yards And re-entered service in March 2023 after four weeks at the blohm & voss yard.

Overview
MS Ventura is owned by Carnival UK and operated by P&O Cruises. When the ship entered service in April 2008 she was one of the largest cruise ships built for the British market. Ventura can accommodate 3,192 passengers, and has 1,550 cabins, of which about 60% possess private balconies. It has fourteen public decks, eight restaurants, six boutiques, five pools and three show lounges, including a theatre.

After being handed over on 29 March, Ventura arrived in Southampton in the morning of 6 April 2008, ahead of its first mini cruise to Belgium on 11 April, and her first full cruise on 18 April.

British actress Dame Helen Mirren officially christened Ventura and became the ship's "Godmother", prior to its maiden cruise to the Mediterranean Sea. In a break with tradition, Dame Helen commanded a team of Royal Marine Commandos to assist her in naming Ventura in a dramatic abseil.

Accidents and incidents

Passenger "rebellion"
During the Christmas 2008/New Year 2009 period in the Caribbean, there were reports of loutish behaviour on board, culminating in a rift between passengers who had paid the full fare and those who had not, described by the media as a passenger "rebellion". As a result of the problems, two passengers were ejected from the ship and three scheduled ports of call were omitted from the itinerary.

Bay of Biscay damage
After experiencing bad weather on 18 October 2012 in the Bay of Biscay, Ventura suffered slight damage to the aluminium superstructure deck high up on the ship. Ventura underwent repairs in Southampton on 19 October 2012. P&O stated that this had no structural strength or safety implications. Some passengers were ordered not to use their balconies.

Power failure
Shortly after leaving the southern tip of Tenerife, on 25 October 2014 at around 6.15pm, Ventura experienced a fault with two of its six engines. As a result, power was lost. Once generators were working again and providing power to the ship, the engines restarted, around 40 minutes later. It then proceeded onwards, completing its further itinerary with no further issues. It was, however, reported by passengers that the same thing had happened on departure from Genoa, a week earlier.

Jetski rescue

On 5 September 2018, Ventura was involved in a rescue mission off the coast of Gibraltar. Three men were rescued, when their jet ski had run out of petrol and drifted  into the Mediterranean Sea. All three men were rescued safely and stayed on Ventura until the Spanish Coast Guard arrived to collect them.

Propulsion system failure (2019)
On 8 December 2019, Ventura suffered technical problems with her propulsion system. Tugboat assistance was called for and overnight Ventura was assisted back to the port of Santa Cruz de Tenerife. The ship had lost all four of her propulsion convertors following a major steam leak in the technical spaces where these systems were housed. The convertors were completely shut down and major components identified as needing replacing as these had failed in due to ingress of steam into the systems.  Repair work was completed on one propulsion system on the 10th and a short sea trial conducted overnight with Lloyds Surveyors and Carnivals Electrical SME overseeing the tests.  12 December 2019 both propulsion systems were repaired and fully tested with a short sea trial being conducted in waters off Tenerife with tugs available in case of any problems. lloyds and the ships team were satisfied the ship was safe to operate without further restrictions and Ventura returned to Southampton missing out on the scheduled stops of Lanzarote and Lisbon. An engineering team remained onboard the ship to monitor the systems and disembarked in Southampton on the 17th. A reduction of 50% of the fares was promised to all passengers. A total of 600 passengers elected to be flown back to the UK by charter aircraft on 12 December.

During a presentation to passengers in the Arena Theatre on 16 December 2019, Captain Andy Willard gave more details of the technical problems. On a scale of 1-10 he ranked this problem as '9'. He further explained that five tugs attended on 8 December two of which were 'pirate' tugs hoping for salvage rights. Specialist parts to repair the propulsion problem were flown in from Los Angeles, a sister ship in the Caribbean and the manufacturers in Germany together with a team of technical specialists. Ventura returned to Southampton on 17 December 2019, three days later than scheduled. No injuries were sustained with damage limited to the propulsion convertors and the steam system. On the voyage following this incident further incidents occurred aboard involving a Muster call and a fire in the onboard restaurant resulting in a crewmember being airlifted from the ship by the Portuguese coastguard on the morning following.

Propulsion system failure (2022)

On 6 February 2022 at approximately 1830 Ventura suffered a power and propulsion failure about 40 nm South of Plymouth in the English Channel. This failure was at the end of a 35 day cruise to the Caribbean. After 10 minutes lighting was restored and the main engines were restarted after a further 20 minutes. The ship then continued to Southampton docking around 0600 on 7 February at Ocean Terminal without incident. During the 30 minute failure the vessel drifted beam on to the prevailing westerlies at around 4kn.

Luggage Incident
On 4 June 2022 a forklift, operated by the Port of Southampton, dropped a luggage cart into the River Solent while attempting to lift it from the vessel. Two ship's tenders were launched to retrieve the luggage, unfortunately a small number of bags could not be recovered.

2020 pandemic
During the 2020 coronavirus layoff, the vessel spent some time moored off Bournemouth and Teignmouth.

References

External links 

 Ventura P&O website

 

2007 ships
Ships of P&O Cruises
Passenger ships of Bermuda
Ships built by Fincantieri
Maritime incidents in 2012
Maritime incidents in 2019
Maritime incidents in 2022